Michael McCormick LaPlante (born October 27, 1966) is an American college basketball coach, who coached Jacksonville State University for eight seasons. His contract was not renewed following the 2007-08 season. Before becoming the head men's basketball coach at JSU, LaPlante served as an assistant coach at Auburn University, University of Maine and Yale University. LaPlante also worked as a consultant to the Senegalese Basketball Federation.

Personal 
LaPlante was born in Holyoke, Massachusetts to Edward and Phyllis LaPlante. He is a 1989 graduate of the University of Maine with a B.S. in Education and earned his J.D. degree from the Birmingham School of Law in 2012.  He is licensed to practice law in the State of Alabama. LaPlante is married to the former Leslie Henson and has four children; Courtney, Jackson, McCormick and Kaylee.

Coaching history 

Jacksonville State University

During his tenure at JSU LaPlante set Division I school records for most wins in a career (95), most wins in a season (20), most wins in a two-year period (34), and most wins in  a three-year period (47).

Auburn University

Prior to being named Head Basketball Coach at Jacksonville State, LaPlante served as an assistant coach to Cliff Ellis at Auburn University from 1996 - 2000. While at Auburn the program set new records for most wins in a season (29), most wins in a two-year period (54), and captured the school's first SEC Basketball Championship in over 40 years. LaPlante quickly established himself as one of the top recruiters in the country by helping Auburn to four Top 20 recruiting classes.

University of Maine

As an assistant to Rudy Keeling at the University of Maine, LaPlante quickly established himself as an excellent recruiter and on the floor coach. During his tenure at Maine the Black Bears set school records for most wins in a season (20), reaching the 20 win plateau for the first time in school history. It was during this time that LaPlante established a relationship with the Senegalese Basketball Federation as a consultant that has led to his strong connection with that country's basketball development.

Yale University

LaPlante's first coaching opportunity was as an assistant to Dick Kuchen at Yale. While at Yale the Bulldogs set modern era records for most wins (19) and made a run at the Ivy League Championship losing out to Princeton.

Head coaching record

References 

1966 births
Living people
American men's basketball coaches
Auburn Tigers men's basketball coaches
Basketball coaches from Massachusetts
Basketball players from Massachusetts
College men's basketball head coaches in the United States
Jacksonville State Gamecocks men's basketball coaches
Maine Black Bears men's basketball coaches
Maine Black Bears men's basketball players
Sportspeople from Holyoke, Massachusetts
Yale Bulldogs men's basketball coaches
American men's basketball players